Showak (also Ash Showak or el Showak),
Showak is a major transport hub between Gedaref, the state capital and Kassala city.

The national highway linking Khartoum and the rest of the country with Port Sudan, as well as the railway line parallel to it,  passes through Showak. Showak has the largest cattle market in the state and contains a special clinic, affiliated with Khartoum University, which treats camels. It also hosts a large UN Refugees camp in its vicinity known as the Shagarab Refugees camp and is home to the Sudanese headquarters of the United Nations High Commissioner for Refugees. There is one hospital in the town, Ash Showak Rural Hospital, and a branch of the Agricultural Bank of Sudan, located in the town's main market.

Climate
Showak has a hot semi-arid climate (Köppen climate classification BSh) with two distinct seasons: a short, sweltering and extremely oppressive wet season from mid-June to mid-September and a sweltering, desiccating dry season covering the rest of the year.

References 

Populated places in Al Qadarif (state)